Fairfield Township is a township in Russell County, Kansas, United States. As of the 2010 United States Census, it had a population of 31.

Geography
The township lies in the Smoky Hills region of the Great Plains. The Smoky Hill River forms the northern border of the township. Two of the river's tributaries, Sellers Creek and Goose Creek, flow north across the township.

Located in south-central Russell County, it contains no incorporated settlements. Fairfield Township borders Center Township to the northeast and east, Barton County's Union and Wheatland Townships to the south and southwest, Lincoln Township to the west, and Grant Township to the northwest.

Demographics

As of the 2010 census, there were 31 people, 15 households, and 11 families residing in the township. The racial makeup of the township was 100.0% White. Hispanic or Latino of any race were 0.0% of the population.

There were 15 households, out of which 13.3% had children under the age of 18 living with them, 73.3% were married couples living together, and 26.7% were non-families. 20.0% of all households were made up of individuals, and 6.7% had someone living alone who was 65 years of age or older. The average household size was 2.07, and the average family size was 2.09.

In the township, the population was spread out, with 16.1% under the age of 18, 0.0% from 18 to 24, 9.7% from 25 to 44, 58.0% from 45 to 64, and 16.1% who were 65 years of age or older. The median age was 56.8 years. For every 100 females, there were 63.2 males. For every 100 females age 18 and over, there were 85.7 males age 18 and over.

Education
Fairfield Township lies within unified school district 407, Russell County Schools.

Transportation
A network of mostly unpaved county roads laid out in a rough grid pattern covers the township. One paved county road, Bunker Hill-Hoisington Road, enters the township from the northeast and zigzags to the north-central part of the township before finally turning south. Another paved north–south road, Pioneer Road, enters the township from the north and turns east in the north-central part of the township, terminating at its junction with Bunker Hill-Hoisington Road. Michaelis Road, a paved east–west road, enters the township from the west and terminates at Bunker Hill-Hoisington Road in the southern part of the township.

References

Townships in Russell County, Kansas
Townships in Kansas
Populated places in Kansas